Calvary Cemetery is an Roman Catholic cemetery in South Portland, Maine, US.

Notable interments
 John Anglin (1850–1905), Medal of Honor recipient
 Daniel Joseph Feeney (1894–1969), Roman Catholic Bishop
 James Augustine Healy (1830–1900), Roman Catholic Bishop
 Charles J. Loring Jr. (1918–1952), Medal of Honor recipient
 Kid Madden (1866–1896), professional baseball player

References

External links
 
 

Roman Catholic Diocese of Portland
Buildings and structures in South Portland, Maine
Cemeteries in Cumberland County, Maine
Roman Catholic cemeteries in the United States